The Macaulay Library is the world's largest archive of animal sounds. It includes more than 33 million photographs, 1.2 million audio recordings, and over two hundred thousand videos covering 96 percent of the world's bird species. There are an ever-increasing numbers of insect, fish, frog, and mammal recordings. The Library is part of Cornell Lab of Ornithology of Cornell University.

History 
Arthur Augustus Allen and Peter Paul Kellogg made the first recordings of bird sound on May 18, 1929 in an Ithaca park. They used motion-picture film with synchronized sound to record a song sparrow, a house wren, and a rose-breasted grosbeak. This was the Beginning of Cornell Library of Natural Sounds. Graduate student Albert R. Brand and Cornell undergraduate M. Peter Keane developed recording equipment for use in the open field. In the next two years they had successfully recorded more than 40 species of birds. In 1931 Peter Keane and True McLean (a Cornell professor in Electrical Engineering) designed and built a parabolic reflector for field recordings of bird songs. They used World War I parabola molds from the Cornell Physics Department. In 1940 Albert R. Brand produced an extensive bird song field guide album “American Bird Songs”. The sales of phonograph records of bird sounds remained a key source of income for the Lab of Ornithology since these days.

In 2020 the Internet Bird Collection (IBC) was incorporated into the Macaulay Library, which now hosts all of the content contained in the IBC.

Recording Data 
The basic data of the modern recordings contains: 
Species name
Date
Time of day
Location
GPS coordinates
Behavioral context of sound
Natural sound or response to playback. If playback was used announce this on tape.
Number of individuals
Habitat description
Weather (e.g. degree of overcast, air temperature, water temperature (important for amphibian recordings.)
Recording equipment-Audio recorder make and model; microphone make and model; if used filter positions
Distance to animal

Name 
The name of Macaulay Library honoring Linda and William (Bill) Macaulay, which donated a significant campaign contribution to fund the new facility (2003) of the library at Sapsucker Woods.
Linda Macaulay added also nearly 6,000 individual birdsong recordings of over 2,600 species.

See also 
Scientific collection

References 

Cornell University
Science libraries in the United States
Collecting
Collections
Bird sounds
University and college academic libraries in the United States